The year 614 BC was a year of the pre-Julian Roman calendar. In the Roman Empire, it was known as year 140 Ab urbe condita . The denomination 614 BC for this year has been used since the early medieval period, when the Anno Domini calendar era became the prevalent method in Europe for naming years.

Events
 The Medes and Babylonians sack Assur.

Births

Deaths
 King Mu of Chu, king of Chu

References